This is a list of primary schools and secondary schools in the Asian country of Iraq.  

Kurdistan, Erbil -
Zhyar Private school
Chueifat international school 
Faxir mergasory public school
Barz Private school 
Shkodar public school 
Rozak public school

Baghdad 
Schools in the city of Baghdad, Baghdad Governorate, include:

 Al-Adel Elementary School – kindergarten and elementary; grades 1– 6
 Al-Eelaf high school for Girls
 Al-Ameen High School for Girls
 Al Aqida - Al Rahibat High School for Girls – established 1928
 Al-Bohtry Primary School
 Al-Forat High School for Boys
 Al Hariri High School –  girls' school 
 Al-I'tizaz Secondary School for Girls
 Al. Jumouriea Secondary High School for Boys
 Al. Jumouriea Secondary High School for Girls
 Al-Kansaa Secondary School for Girls
 Al-Mansour High School for Boys – one of the largest secondary schools (junior high: 900 students; and high school: 1,000 students); bilingual (English, French); optional trade courses; established 1967
 Al-Mohopeen High School for Boys – Al-Khadhraa
 Al-Mutamaizat High School for Girls – al-Karkh, al-Khadraa 
 Al-Mutamaizat High School R1 for Girls – Al-Risafa 1, Al-A'adamia
 Al-Mutamaizat High School R2 for Girls – Al-Risafa 2, Palestine Street
 Al-Mutamaizeen High School for Boys – al Harthiya
 Al-Mutamaizeen High School for Boys – al-Karkh, al-Khadraa 
 Al-Mutamaizeen High School R1 for Boys – Al-Risafa 1, Palestine Street
 Al-Mutamaizeen High School R2 for Boys – Al-Risafa 2, Palestine Street, Al-Idrisi
 Al. Nazaha Secondary High School for Girls
 Al-Nizamiyah High School School for Boys
 Al-Risala Preparatory School for Boys – Al-Qahira
 Al-Sharqiya High School for Boys
 Al-Sharqiya High School for Girls
 Al-Syiaddah Al-wataneyya Elementary School – grades 1–6
 Al-Tamim High School for Boys
 Baquba High School
 Baghdad College – secondary school for boys
 Baghdad High School for Girls – formerly known as the American High School for Girls
 Damascus Primary School for Girls and Boys
 Markaziyah High School - is the oldest and most renowned high school in Iraq.
 The Gifted Students' School – co-educational secondary school
 Thalathoon Tammooz High School for Girls
 Tigris Secondary School for Girls

Baquba
Schools in the city of Baquba, Diyala Governorate, include:

 Al-Maarif High School for Boys
 Al-Adnaniah High School for Girls
 Al-Edadia Al-Markazia High School for Boys
 Al-Huria High School for Girls
 Al-Jawahery High School for Boys
 Al-Najaf Al-Ashraf High School for Boys
 Al-Sharif Al-Radhi High School for Boys
 Aysha High School for Girls
 Um-Salamah High School for Girls

Basrah 
Schools in the city of Basrah, Basrah Governorate, include:

 Al-Ashaar High School for Girls
 Al-Rafidain Private Schools
 Al-Markazya – Boys' secondary school
 Al-Mutamaizat High School for Girls
 Al-Mutamaizeen High School for Boys
 Al-Thakafa al-Arabia – elementary school
 Anbariyn School – in a Shi'ite quarter; has 1,500 pupils; attended by boys in the morning and girls in the afternoon
 Basrah Ishik Schools
 Basrah Ishik Kindergarten
 Basrah Ishik Al Zaytoon Campus
 Basrah Ishik Al Qibla Campus
 Khalisa Girls School – established in the 1930s
 Mawtani private school

Erbil
Schools in the city of Erbil, Erbil Governorate, include:

~ British International Schools in Kurdistan- Hawler 

~ French International School

~ Ishik Ronaky School

~ International School of Choueifat Erbil

~ Italian City 2 school

~ Kurdistan high school
 
~ Zhyar Private school
 
~ Barz Private school
 
~ Hawler Private school

~ Canadian International School

Mosul 
Schools in the city of Mosul, Nineveh Governorate, include:

 Al-Mouhobeen Secondary School for Boys and Girls
 Al-Mustaqbal High School for Boys
 Al-Mutamaizat High School for Girls
 Al-Mutamaizeen High School for Boys
 Al-Resalah Al-Islamia (Al-Resalah) High School for Boys
 Al-Sharqiya High School for Boys
 Kourtoba High School for Girls

Sulaymaniyah 
Schools in the city of Sulaymaniyah, Sulaymaniyah Governorate, include:

 AISS American International School of Sulaimani
 Azmar College For The Gifted Students
 Classical School of the Medes
 Danielle Mitterrand, The French School of Sulaymaniyah – 
 Hawcharkh School – secondary and high school 
 Junior Private School – English basic school; Grdy Sarchnar near Pak City; 

Shaheed Jabar exemplary high school
The International School of Choueifat – Sulaimani - Qasimlo Street, Sulaimani, Kurdistan, Iraq, 46001 - iscsuli.sabis.net
 Azmar high school the best high school in Iraq and Middle East

Zakho 
Schools in the city of Zakho, Dohuk Governorate, include:
 British International School Zakho – EYFS and Y1-Y10;

See also

 Education in Iraq
 Lists of schools

Schools
Schools
Schools
Iraq
Iraq